"Man of the House" is the thirteenth episode of the eighth season of House and the 168th overall. It aired on February 20, 2012. The episode marks the return of Dominika Petrova to the series for a mini-arc, and guest stars José Zúñiga as the immigration official.

Plot
House treats a marriage expert who collapses during a seminar. However, as the patient gets worse, so do his feelings about the institution he's an expert on. House's attention is focused on his own "marriage" when his green-card wife Dominika returns in order to prove to the immigration authorities that she and House are in a "bona fide" marriage. Faced with jail for House and deportation for Dominika, this turns into a crash course in which both will learn a little something about love and marriage while they learn about each other. House also decides to formally appoint one of his fellows as the team leader. Final diagnosis: Silent thyroiditis secondary to polyglandular autoimmune syndrome type III.

Reception
The Onion's AV Club gave this episode a B− rating, while Lisa Palmer of TV Fanatic gave it a 3.0/5.0 rating.

References

External links

"Man of the House" at Fox.com
Medical review of "Man of the House"

House (season 8) episodes
2012 American television episodes
Works about immigration to the United States